The 2015 Supercopa Euroamericana was the first edition of the Supercopa Euroamericana, a men's football friendly tournament created by DirecTV, disputed between the Copa Sudamericana and the UEFA Europa League winners. The match was played in 2015 by River Plate, the 2014 Copa Sudamericana champions, and Sevilla, the 2013–14 UEFA Europa League champions. The match took place on 26 March at the Estadio Monumental Antonio Vespucio Liberti in Buenos Aires. River Plate won the match 1–0.

Format
The match was played for 90 minutes. In the case of a draw after regulation, the winners were determined via a penalty shoot-out.

Details

See also
2015 Copa EuroAmericana
Club Atlético River Plate in international football competitions
Sevilla FC in international football competitions

References

External links 
Supercopa Euroamericana: Official site

Supercopa Euroamericana
2015 in South American football
2015–16 in European football
Supercopa Euroamericana 2015
Supercopa Euroamericana 2015
2015 in Argentine football
Football in Buenos Aires